École d'ingénieurs Denis-Diderot is a French engineering college, created in 2011.

The school trains engineers in physics, biology, nanotechnologies, and IT. Located in Paris, the École d'ingénieurs Denis-Diderot is a public higher education institution member of the Université Paris Cité. The school has been named in honour of the French philosopher Denis Diderot.

References

External links
 École d'ingénieurs Denis-Diderot website

2011 establishments in France
Educational institutions established in 2011
Engineering universities and colleges in France
Universities and colleges in Paris